Konstantin Kotsev (June 4, 1926 – August 4, 2007) was a Bulgarian stage and film actor.

Kotsev was amid the most popular Bulgarian actors from the last decades of 20th century.
He is best known for his roles in classic Bulgarian films such as The Tied Up Balloon (1967), The Swedish Kings (1968), The white room (1968), Naked Conscience (1971), Toplo / Warmth (1978), Time of Violence (1988), as well as his numerous notable performances on the stage.

Konstantin Kotsev was decorated with the high titles “Honoured Artist” and “People's Artist”.

Biography and career
Born Konstantin Vasilev Kotsev on June 4, 1926, in the city of Istanbul, he entered the law faculty at the St. Kliment Ohridski University of Sofia where he graduated in 1950. Subsequently, he enrolled acting at The National Academy for Theatre and Film Arts graduating in 1958.

After the graduation, Kotsev was appointed in the Burgas Theatre for a year. In 1959, he joined the troupe of the newly founded Satirical Theatre „Aleko Konstantinov“ in Sofia where he remained until 1984. During the end of the 1980s, Kotsev was part of the Municipal Theatre of Sofia.

His film debut in a main role was in 1958 in the Bulgarian film classic On a Small Island directed by Rangel Valchanov.

Kotsev has a son Dimitar (born 1971) and a daughter Zornitsa (born 1972).

Partial filmography

References

Sources

External links
 

Bulgarian male film actors
Bulgarian male stage actors
Bulgarian male television actors
1926 births
2007 deaths
Male actors from Istanbul
Bulgarians in Istanbul
20th-century Bulgarian male actors
21st-century Bulgarian male actors